Jack Gibson OAM (27 February 1929 – 9 May 2008) was an Australian rugby league coach, player, and commentator. He is widely considered one of the greatest coaches in the sport's history. Nicknamed 'Supercoach', he was highly regarded not only for his coaching record but also for his thirst for innovation, as he introduced new coaching and training methods into the sport in the 1970s, and 1980s, when first-grade rugby league was then still played and coached on a semi-professional basis.

He played and coached in Sydney's top grade competition, the New South Wales Rugby Football League premiership, and coached Eastern Suburbs to premierships in 1974 and 1975 and later the Parramatta Eels to three successive premierships from 1981 to 1983.

Early life
Born in Kiama, New South Wales, Gibson's family relocated to Sydney in his youth. He played third-grade rugby league at St. George in 1950 before joining a social side in the Eastern Suburbs A-grade competition called Taylor's Celebrity Club. Gibson worked as a bouncer for Joe Taylor at the sly drinking and gambling outlet Thommo's Two-Up School, as well as other Sydney nightclubs that Taylor owned. Gibson also fought as an amateur for the NSW boxing title.

Playing career

Roosters
Gibson was graded with Eastern Suburbs in 1953. He debuted in first grade and represented for New South Wales that same year. In 1954 he also represented for Sydney but spent the second half of the season in the country at Grenfell, New South Wales following some work troubles. He returned to St. George Dragons in 1957, and played in the third grade grand final.

Returning to Easts in 1955 Gibson went on to play 152 first grade games for the club primarily at prop or second-row. He made a further Sydney representative appearance in 1958 and captained the Roosters in the 1960 Grand final loss to St. George. He left Easts at the end of 1961.

Newtown & Wests
Gibson spent the 1962 season with Newtown and was set for retirement until the club put him on open contract at the end of 1962. He was snapped up by Wests, playing out his career in the 1963 and 1964 seasons, including their 1963 Grand final loss.

Wests 1963 Grand Final loss to St George was controversial thanks to some perceived biased refereeing by Darcy Lawler. Prior to the game, one Wests player (later named to be Gibson by team captain Arthur Summons) entered the change room at the Sydney Cricket Ground and promptly told his teammates that if they had backed themselves to win they had better lay off their bets because he had been informed by his own SP Bookie that "The ref has backed St George". During the game, played on an extremely muddy ground thanks to heavy rain and lower grade games that had churned up the cricket pitch area, Lawler had made some questionable decisions against Wests. Just before half time, Wests had a try disallowed. With St George leading 5–3, centre Gil MacDougall had a chance to give Wests the lead when he won a race to the ball and looked to have grounded it for a try, but Lawler ruled that he did not ground it. Later with 15 minutes to go and the score still favouring Saints 5–3, St George winger Johnny King scored a controversial match winning try with Wests players claiming that King had been tackled and that they believed Lawler had called him to play the ball, only for King to get up and continue his run to the try line with Lawler then awarding the try giving St George an 8–3 win and their third straight Grand Final win over Wests. Both decisions fueled the debate about Lawler's impartiality on the day. Lawler, who awarded St George the penalties 18–7, retired after the match.

Cricketer
Gibson also played first-grade cricket for the Waverley club in Sydney, taking 92 wickets as a fast bowler.

Coaching

Early coaching years
Jack Gibson began his first-grade NSWRL coaching career at Eastern Suburbs in 1967. In 1966 the club had not won a match, but Gibson took them to the semi-finals that first year. Gibson's tactics of having a mobile, hard-working forward pack combined with a fast-moving defensive line that stifled their opposition saw Easts build the best defensive record in the competition. In 1968 the team finished with a defensive record second only to eventual premiers South Sydney and again made the semi-finals, then were knocked out in week one by St. George.

Gibson then left Easts to join St George, taking all three grades at the club to the 1971 Grand Final. On leaving the Dragons he linked up with Newtown where he enjoyed immediate success, taking out the Wills Cup pre-season tournament, helping the foundation club to its only club championship and a berth in the preliminary final where they were knocked out by Cronulla. Tellingly, the following year after Gibson had left, the Jets slipped back and finished the season in 7th place.

Roosters premierships
In the 1973 the high-rolling Eastern Suburbs Leagues Club at Bondi Junction announced a phenomenal $600,000 profit. The club set about to regain premiership honours that they hadn't seen since 1945 and bought Souths Test hooker Elwyn Walters to add to their experienced forwards in Arthur Beetson and Ron Coote and made a headline-grabbing buy in rugby union international Russell Fairfax to add to their already strong and fast backline. Securing former club-captain and coach Gibson put all the pieces in place.

1974
Easts dominated the  1974 season winning 19 of 22 matches to finish eight points ahead of their nearest rivals. When they were surprisingly beaten by Canterbury in the major semi-final, Gibson launched a scathing attack on referee Keith Page claiming "if Page has the final I may as well not send a team out." Over the next ten years, Gibson would turn the highly popular coaching technique of blaming the referee for his side's losses into an art form.

On Grand final day Eastern Suburbs were simply too good for a courageous Canterbury outfit in spite of suffering 12–3 penalty count after 59 minutes. Gibson had won his first premiership and the Roosters their first in 29 years.

1975
In season 1975 after losing consecutive matches in rounds 2 and 3, the Roosters juggernaut rolled on and they posted 19 consecutive wins to close out the regular season; a streak that ran from round 4 to round 22 and remains the equal record for the most consecutive wins in premiership history with the 2021 Melbourne Storm team. The Roosters dominated St. George on Grand Final day with a punishing 6 try haul in the second half and an emphatic 38–0 victory. In addition to the back-to-back premiership titles, Gibson also steered the club that season to victory in the mid-week Amco Cup and to a rightful claim as the best club team in the world in defeating English champions, St Helens R.F.C. in the inaugural World Club Challenge.

By 1976 a number of other clubs, notably Parramatta and Manly had caught up with the high standards that Gibson had fostered at Easts; the club's dominance ended and he moved onto greener (and red) pastures. There at South Sydney Gibson endured the leanest spell of his career failing to get as far as the semi-finals in his two seasons with the club of 1978 and 1979.

Parramatta premierships
Gibson then linked with Parramatta leading them to the most successful era in their history taking out three consecutive premierships from 1981 to  1983.

1981
In club Chief-Executive Denis Fitzgerald Gibson found an ally in his remorseless approach to sledging referees and applying pressure via the media. On 5 April 1981, Gibson dared the Referees Appointments Board to give Greg Hartley another Eels match after they lost 12–8 to Canterbury. The following week Gibson sent a personal letter to Kevin Roberts complimenting him for his handling of the Parramatta-Souths match which the Eels won 39–5. Come finals time, Gibson continued to apply pressure when he publicly criticised the appointment of Hartley to control the Eels  major semi-final clash with Eastern Suburbs. The tactic may have proved effective – Parramatta beat Easts 12–8 when Hartley awarded Parramatta two vital penalties in extra time which Mick Cronin converted. But nonetheless the better team still won on the day

On Grand final day 1981 Parramatta found themselves up against rank outsiders Newtown playing in their first premiership decider in 26 years. Parramatta were still looking for their first title ever and their old hands in Edge, Price, Hilditch and O'Reilly along with the explosive young backline of Kenny, Cronin, Sterling, Grothe and Ella all masterfully mentored by Gibson took the premiership glory. Later back at the packed Parramatta Leagues Club auditorium, Gibson had just six words for the club faithful: "Ding, dong, the witch is dead," he said before the thunderous chants of the success-starved blue and gold army of fans who in their zeal later that night burned the old Cumberland Oval grandstand to the ground. After the win a more gracious Parramatta management submitted an official apology to the NSWRFL over the Gibson-Hartley feud.

1982
Under Gibson the nucleus of that side was kept together and the Eels went on to win the competition in the next two years – season 1982 and season 1983.

Manly were comfortable pre-match favourites for the 1982 Grand Final having demolished Parramatta three times that season including a 20–0 drubbing in a spiteful major semi-final. Gibson, Fitzgerald and lock-forward Ray Price again employed the tactic of publicly criticising referees and in the week leading up the match John Gocher was the target of the pressure. When the Sea-Eagles scored first in the second minute it looked like the game was playing to expectations but things changed from there. Parramatta's forward pack began to dominate Manly's all international six and before half-time Brett Kenny crossed for two tries and set-up another three for Sterling, Ella and Neil Hunt to ensure a second title for the Eels.

That Parramatta could come back from the semi-final loss and defeat Easts 33–0 in the Preliminary Final was testament to the skill of Gibson and the quality of the side. That they did the same to Manly the following week in the Grand Final is further evidence of the enormous self-belief that Gibson was able to generate in the team.

1983
Claims that the week's rest for winning the major semi-final could work against a side surfaced again when Parramatta dismissed Manly 18–6 in the 1983 Grand Final. The Sea-Eagles trailed 12–0 after 29 minutes and didn't score a point until the 45th minute. The champion Eels and their coach Gibson were indisputedly at the top of the football tree.

The 1983 title took Gibson's personal Grand Final win tally to five, then sharing with Ken Kearney jointly the title of the most successful coach in Australian premiership history. It would be over twenty years before Brisbane Broncos coach Wayne Bennett, himself a great admirer of Gibson, beat that record with the Broncos' premiership win in National Rugby League season 2006.

Cronulla-Sutherland
Gibson's last club coaching role was with the Cronulla-Sutherland Sharks from 1985 to 1987. He had few big-name players to work with but did an admirable job in developing a pool of local junior talent and the club eventually made the semi-finals in the two immediate years following his departure.

State of Origin 
Gibson was given the New South Wales Blues to coach in the 1989 State of Origin series.  The team had previously lost five successive games and Gibson was brought in along with a number of sweeping player changes. However the new squad did no better and Gibson had to suffer the ignominy of a 3–0 whitewash to a Maroons side coached by his friend and protégé Arthur Beetson. The following year in 1990 he had his revenge when his New South Wales side trumped Beetson's Queenslanders 2–1. Gibson quit while on top to take up a role back at the Roosters in 1991 as manager with former Test halfback Mark Murray as coach. He did this until 1994.

Coaching influences
Gibson studied coaching and training methods in other sports looking for innovations which could be incorporated into his rugby league coaching.  In particular, he would often travel to the USA to watch NFL teams play and train.  Gibson was a fan of legendary Green Bay Packers coach Vince Lombardi and was influenced by Lombardi's coaching and management style.

The Cadigan reference reports that rugby league identity Terry Fearnley first introduced Gibson to the sayings and attitudes of Vince Lombardi via a 1971 sales and motivational film called The Second Effort which contained a Lombardi segment. Gibson's charges at St George had at that stage of the 1971 season won only four of their first eight games. After embracing the film and its messages and showing it to the entire St George playing roster, all three Dragons sides were unbeaten for the next seven weeks; lost just two of the remaining 14 matches; and all three grades of the club made it to their respective Grand finals that year.

He befriended San Francisco 49ers coach Dick Nolan at an NFL annual conference in 1972 and was invited to study and observe the operations of the 49ers team. From these trips came a number of methodologies that changed the Australian game.

Coaching innovations
 First to use a computer to evaluate player performance including being the first club coach to track and use individual player tackle counts.
 His teams were the first to train with sides from other codes – he trained his team alongside soccer players and used Australian Football specialists as kicking coaches.
 Introduced mascara under the eyes to reduce glare for night games under lights.
 First to use weights-machines such as the Nautilus exercise machines.
 First to use video extensively as a coaching device.
 First to have players' fitness scientifically tested in pre-season with the "pinch test" (skinfold method).
 First to insist upon his own integrated coaching team including co-ordinator (Ron Massey), fitness conditioner (Mick Souter) and injury treatment/rehabilitation (Alf Richards).
 Made the bomb a potent attacking weapon used by both Easts and Parramatta under exponent John Peard.

Laconic wit
Gibson was also known for his notable and laconic quotes.  Players, coaches and journalists in Australia would hang on every word he said and many of Gibson's quotes showed his great wisdom on the sport. His sardonic one-liners were embraced by Australian press looking to colour their sports pages and many of his quotes are still referred to within rugby league circles.

Accolades
Gibson's esteem in Australian rugby league remained strong throughout his life. Up until he was incapacitated,  past players, coaches and journalists still telephoned him for advice or a quote, even though he hadn't been actively involved in game for some time.

In 1988 Gibson was awarded the Medal of the Order of Australia "for service to rugby league as a coach". In 2000 he was awarded the Australian Sports Medal for being a five-time premiership winning coach.

On 17 April 2008, Gibson was selected as Coach of Australian rugby league's Team of the Century. Part of the code's centenary year celebrations in Australia, the elite team is the panel's majority choice for those considered to be the best of all time.

The Jack Gibson Cup has been contested each season since 2008 by the Sydney Roosters and Parramatta Eels clubs, whom Gibson coached to consecutive premierships in 1974–75 and 1981–83 respectively. The Roosters have won all but one of the matches played for the Jack Gibson Cup.

Personal tragedy
In 1988 Gibson's eldest son Luke aged 25, who had struggled with schizophrenia, died of a heroin overdose. Gibson and his wife Judy became fervent in their support of charities assisting research into schizophrenia and he donated the proceeds of four books he co-wrote with Ian Heads to that cause.

Illness and death
Gibson was confined to a Sydney nursing home for two years before his death and required around-the-clock care as his condition deteriorated.

Gibson died at 6.32pm (AEST) on 9 May 2008, 90 minutes before rugby league's historic Centenary Test Match, after a two-year battle with Alzheimer's disease and dementia. His death was announced during the Centenary test by Peter Sterling on the Nine Network.

At all rugby league matches that weekend a minute's silence was held for him.

References

Sources 
 Whiticker, Alan & Hudson, Glen (2006) The Encyclopedia of Rugby League Players, Gavin Allen Publishing, Sydney
 Andrews, Malcolm (2006) The ABC of Rugby League Austn Broadcasting Corpn, Sydney
 Jack Gibson (with Ian Heads) The Last Word ABC Books, Sydney 
 Jack Gibson (with Ian Heads) Played Strong, Done Fine : The Jack Gibson Collection Lester-Townsend Publishing. Sydney. 1988
 Jack Gibson Winning Starts on Monday: From the Jack Gibson Collection Lester-Townsend Publishing. Sydney. 1989
 Neil Cadigan, Tribute Article, Sydney Daily Telegraph 10 May 2008
 Whiticker, Alan & Collis, Ian (2006) The History of Rugby League Clubs, New Holland, Sydney
 Haddan, Steve (2007) The Finals – 100 Years of National Rugby League Finals, Steve Haddan Publishing, Brisbane
Jack Gibson biography at Sport Australia Hall of Fame
Jack Gibson: 'Greatest ever' rugby league coach – Obituary by Dave Hadfield for The Independent (London) Monday, 12 May 2008

Further reading

 
 
 
 
 
 
 

1929 births
2008 deaths
Australian rugby league coaches
Australian rugby league commentators
Australian rugby league players
Cronulla-Sutherland Sharks coaches
New South Wales Rugby League State of Origin coaches
New South Wales rugby league team players
Newtown Jets coaches
Newtown Jets players
Parramatta Eels coaches
Recipients of the Australian Sports Medal
Recipients of the Medal of the Order of Australia
Rugby league players from New South Wales
Rugby league props
South Sydney Rabbitohs coaches
Sport Australia Hall of Fame inductees
St. George Dragons coaches
Sydney Roosters coaches
Sydney Roosters players
Western Suburbs Magpies players